Many Japanese ships have been named Toko Maru or Tōkō Maru, some adding a numeral (eg "No.2").

  (ex-Toko Maru), a Japanese government yacht and former research vessel 
Japanese auxiliary stores ship Tōkō Maru No. 2 Go, an auxiliary transport ship of the Imperial Japanese 5th Fleet in 1942
Toko Maru, a research/fishing vessel launched in 1970, and later converted to yacht Titanic

See also
Tokomaru (canoe), a Maori oceangoing canoe used in migrations that settled New Zealand
, a British steam cargo ship built in 1893 as Westmeath

Ship names